Brent Langdon "Buzz" Williams (born September 1, 1972) is an American basketball coach who is the head coach at Texas A&M University. He previously served as head coach at Virginia Tech from 2014 to 2019, Marquette from 2008 to 2014, and New Orleans during the 2006–07 season, and as an assistant coach at Texas-Arlington, Texas A&M–Kingsville, Northwestern State, Colorado State, and Texas A&M.

Background and personal life
Brent Langdon Williams grew up in Van Alstyne, Texas. He earned a bachelor's degree in kinesiology from Oklahoma City University in 1994 and a master's degree in the same field at Texas A&M University–Kingsville in 1999. Williams married Corey Norman in 2000. They have two daughters (Addyson and Zera) and two sons (Calvin and Mason). Referring to his boundless energy, his coaches at Navarro College nicknamed him Buzz. He was inducted to the Navarro College athletic hall of fame in 2021.

Marquette
Williams coached Marquette to a 25–10 record in the 2008–09 season, where they lost to the Missouri Tigers in the Second Round of the 2009 NCAA tournament. He coached Marquette to a 22–12 record in the 2009–10 season, which ended with a close loss to the 11th-seeded Washington Huskies in the First Round of the 2010 NCAA tournament.

During the 2010–11 campaign, Williams led the Golden Eagles back to the Sweet Sixteen for the first time since 2003. His team went 22–15 including a 9–9 Big East Conference record. They lost in the quarterfinals of the 2011 Big East men's basketball tournament to Louisville. Marquette received an at-large bid in the 2011 NCAA tournament.  There they defeated Xavier in the second round (formerly the First Round) and Syracuse in the Third Round to advance to the Sweet Sixteen. In the Sweet Sixteen, they were defeated by No. 7-ranked and No. 2-seeded North Carolina.

Williams' 2012 team returned to the NCAA tournament after finishing second in the Big East regular season, finishing 14–4 in conference play. As a No. 3 seed in the NCAA Tournament, they defeated BYU and Murray State to advance to their second straight Sweet Sixteen. There, they lost to No. 7-seeded Florida.

After winning a share of the Big East Men's regular season championship, Marquette received an at-large bid in the 2013 NCAA tournament as a No. 3 seed. There, they earned come-from-behind victories over Davidson in the Second Round and Butler in the Third Round. In the Sweet Sixteen, the school's third straight under Williams, they defeated ACC regular season and conference champion Miami to earn a trip to Williams's first Elite Eight, where they lost to Syracuse.

The 2013–14 season was Williams' worst at Marquette, finishing 17–15 with a loss to Xavier in the Big East tournament.

Virginia Tech
Williams was named the head basketball coach at Virginia Tech on March 21, 2014, replacing James Johnson. The move had critics questioning why would he leave Marquette for Virginia Tech, "one of the country’s toughest rebuilding projects." Williams left behind a program at Marquette, which had only nine scholarship players – none taller than 6'7" – for new coach Steve Wojciechowski.

In Williams' first season, the Hokies finished 15th in the ACC with a 2–16 conference record, matching the lowest ACC win total in Virginia Tech history. However, with several true freshmen playing a significant number of minutes, a young nucleus was established. Expectations grew further when Williams landed commitments from Maryland transfer Seth Allen, and Zach LeDay from South Florida. Both became eligible in the 2015–16 season. After a slow start to the season, the team quickly improved. On January 4, 2016, the Hokies defeated their in-state rival and 4th ranked Virginia at home, marking Williams' biggest win at Virginia Tech to date. The team had continued success in the ACC, ending the regular season with another upset of a top-10 rival, this time 7th ranked Miami.  Williams' Hokies finished the regular season at 10–8 in ACC conference play; an improvement of eight wins from the previous year. The Hokies would receive an invite to the 2016 NIT where they advanced to the second round before losing to BYU.

On July 13, 2016, Virginia Tech and Williams agreed to a contract extension through the 2022–23 season. At the same press conference, Buzz also announced his establishment of a new endowment and scholarship for the university. The Buzz’s Bunch Scholarship Endowment will be awarded annually to an undergraduate student at Virginia Tech in any field of study who is registered at the school with a disability. Also, "The Buzz and Corey Williams Family Student-Athlete Scholarship – In Memory of T. Marshall Hahn" will be awarded annually to an undergraduate female student-athlete at Virginia Tech.

The Hokies began the 2016–17 season with an 11–1 non-conference record and won their first ACC conference game against No. 5 Duke in Cassell Coliseum on December 31, 2016. On January 29, 2017, Williams earned his 200th career win as a head coach with a win against Boston College in Blacksburg. After going 5–6 in their first 11 ACC games, the Hokies defeated No. 12 Virginia in double overtime, marking Williams' fourth victory over a top-15 team in the past two years. The Hokies parlayed their success with a trip to the NCAA tournament for the first time since 2007. As the No. 9 seed, they lost in the First Round to Wisconsin.

The 2017-18 team had similar success, finishing the regular season with a 21–11 record and a 10–8 ACC record. Williams led the Hokies to their second consecutive NCAA tournament berth but lost in the first round to Alabama.

The 2018-2019 team entered the top 10 for the first time since the 1995-1996 season. Before the season started, freshman Landers Nolley (Top 100 recruit, 2017-2018 Georgia Player of the Year) was deemed ineligible due to his ACT score being suspiciously high, casting doubt on its validity despite his high school coach describing Nolley as an "Ivy League-type guy". ESPN's Jay Bilas tweeted that this was "another example of why the NCAA should get out of the eligibility business. It's just wrong". In addition, senior leader Chris Clarke was indefinitely suspended prior to the start of the season. During conference play, Justin Robinson sustained a toe injury that kept him out of over half of the Hokies' conference games. Despite these major setbacks, Williams led the Hokies to a 23–7 regular season with 12 wins in the ACC, the most in program history. In addition, Virginia Tech received the fourth seed in the east bracket of the 2019 NCAA Division I men's basketball tournament, tied for the highest seed in program history. After the Hokies defeated Saint Louis University in the first round and Liberty University in the second round, Williams earned a bid to the Sweet 16, the program's first bid since 1967. In their Sweet 16 matchup the Hokies faced ACC rival Duke, a team they defeated earlier in the season. Duke prevailed over Virginia Tech after a missed last second shot by senior Ahmed Hill.

Texas A&M
On April 3, 2019, it was announced that Williams would be leaving Virginia Tech to take the same position at Texas A&M.

In his first season, Williams brought the Aggies to a 16–14 (10–8 SEC) record, and earned himself SEC Coach of the Year honors by the Associated Press due to the strong finish to the regular season. As the team was about to tip off against Missouri in the SEC Tournament, the season was abruptly ended by the start of the COVID-19 pandemic.

The next year, the team was marred by illness from the ongoing pandemic and canceled a majority of their games before drudging to an 8–10 (2–8 SEC) record.

In his third year as coach, the team found its most success to date under Williams as it went 20–11 (9–9 SEC) in the regular season. The team also fought all the way to the SEC championship game in the SEC tournament, defeating #4 Auburn and #15 Arkansas along the way before falling to #9 Tennessee in the finals. The team was expected by many to make it into the NCAA Tournament, but an 8 game losing streak in the regular season was the deciding factor against their entry. The team earned a spot as a 1 seed in the NIT, making it all the way to the championship game in Madison Square Garden before falling to Xavier. The team finished the season with a final record of 27–13 (9–9 SEC).

SEC co-Coach of the year in 2022-23.

Head coaching record

References

External links
 Virginia Tech profile

1972 births
Living people
Basketball coaches from Texas
College men's basketball head coaches in the United States
Colorado State Rams men's basketball coaches
Marquette Golden Eagles men's basketball coaches
Navarro Bulldogs basketball players
New Orleans Privateers men's basketball coaches
Northwestern State Demons basketball coaches
Oklahoma City University alumni
People from Greenville, Texas
People from Van Alstyne, Texas
Sportspeople from the Dallas–Fort Worth metroplex
Texas A&M Aggies men's basketball coaches
Texas A&M University–Kingsville alumni
Texas A&M–Kingsville Javelinas men's basketball coaches
UT Arlington Mavericks men's basketball coaches
Virginia Tech Hokies men's basketball coaches